The Koosh ball is a toy ball made of rubber filaments (strands) radiating from a steel-bound core, patented in 1987 by Scott H. Stillinger. The company later expanded their product line to include 50 other Koosh-related products, including keyrings, baseball sets, and yo-yos.

The ball consists of about 2,000 natural rubber filaments, and has been released in a variety of color combinations. A variation was the Koosh Kins line of Koosh balls with cartoon faces and hands. Koosh Kins was made into a comic book miniseries by Archie Comics, where they kept their cartoon-like appearance.

Koosh balls are often used with QuickStart tennis exercises to help children develop motor skills.

, Koosh balls are manufactured by Hasbro, and the brand has recently expanded into different product lines starting with Koosh Galaxy. The new line consists of toy blasters that fire foam balls similar to the original Nerf ball, and includes a cross-promotion with Angry Birds Star Wars.

References

Bibliography
 "Boom time for toys predicted as the Koosh ball arrives". Textline Multiple Source Collection (1981–1984) (January 30, 1989)
 "New toys not just for kids". The Plain Dealer (September 30, 1989)
 "Novelty rubber ball rises on list of top 20 toys". Houston Chronicle (October 28, 1989)
 "What a Koosh Job. Strange ball bounces along the trend path". Los Angeles Daily News (March 1, 1993)
 "OddzOn announces Koosh Vortex line expansions". Playthings (February 1, 1994)
 "Toymaker parlays Koosh Ball into entire line of tactile toys". The Pantagragh (Bloomington, Illinois) (June 17, 1995)
 "Firm selling 'WOW!' oddball toys generates profits". Cincinnati Post (June 17, 1995)
 Rimer, Sara. "Putting a Smile on Sober Science". The New York Times (May 13, 2004)

External links
 Official site at Hasbro

1980s toys
Products introduced in 1989
2010s toys
Hasbro products
Rubber toys
Toy brands
Sensory toys